Elliot Mason (born 13 January 1977) is an English jazz trombonist. He also plays the keyboard and the bass trumpet. He has been praised by such musicians as Michael Brecker for his technical facility and innovative harmonically complex improvisation.

History
Born in Norwich, England, Elliot was a young talent, playing in clubs as early as age eleven. He rapidly made a name for himself in the local jazz scene.  At age fourteen, he won the national Daily Telegraph Young Jazz Soloist Award and was featured at John Dankworth's Wavendon Jazz School. The following year, Elliot and his brother Brad (trumpet), won the national Daily Telegraph competition for a second time. Mason left England at age sixteen to study at the Berklee College of Music.

In 2007, Mason joined the Jazz at Lincoln Center Orchestra. Meanwhile, Mason also plays in the Mason Brothers Band alongside his brother, Brad. Mason was a featured soloist during the JLCO 2009 premiere tour, which originally aired on PBS.

In 2008, Mason was asked to join the music faculty at Northwestern University.

Awards
Elliot has received numerous accolades, including the Frank Rosolino Award and Slide Hampton Award (Berklee College of Music). He also won the International Trombone Workshop's "Under 29" Jazz Trombone competition in 1995.

References

1977 births
Living people
English jazz trombonists
English jazz trumpeters
British jazz keyboardists
Berklee College of Music alumni
21st-century trombonists
The Delphian Jazz Orchestra members
Jazz at Lincoln Center Orchestra members